The Coordinating Committee for the Refoundation of the Fourth International (CRFI) was a Trotskyist international organisation.  Its name in Spanish was Coordinadora por la Refundación de la Cuarta Internacional.  It was formed in 2004 at a conference in Buenos Aires called by the Movement for the Refoundation of the Fourth International.  It had members in South America, Western Europe and the Middle East.  The committee had nine members from Argentina, Chile, Greece, Italy, Mexico, Uruguay, Turkey, Finland and Venezuela.  They included Jorge Altamira, Savas Matsas, Sungur Savran and Marco Ferrando.

The Argentinian PO was the largest section of the CRFI and as such drew its international co-thinkers into the new organisation from other countries in Latin America. However the Workers Revolutionary Party of Greece and the International Trotskyist Opposition had different roots from the PO and its allies. The fusion of these groups provided the CRFI with bases in both Greece and Italy.

It held a conference of worker-militants in the European and Mediterranean region in Athens in June 2013.  It held a further meeting of its International Committee in December 2013.  It held a second conference of worker-militants in the European and Mediterranean region in Athens in March 2014.

It had next conference "Creating new International" on 2-3 April 2018 in Buenos Aires, hosted by PO of Argentina. The Leader of Russian United Communist Party Darya Mitina was invited, therefore meeting attracted criticism from International Committee of the Fourth International (SEP) based on the allegations of cooperation with "Stalinist forces".

Member sections of the CRFI were as follows:

  Workers' Party (Partido Obrero, PO) in Argentina.
  Revolutionary Workers Party (Partido Obrero Revolucionario, POR) in Chile.
  Workers Revolutionary Party (Ergatiko Epanastatiko Komma, EEK) in Greece.
  Workers Communist Party (Partito Comunista dei Lavoratori, PCL) in Italy.
   (Grupo de Acción Revolucionaria, GAR) in Mexico.
  Workers' Party (Partido de los Trabajadores, PT) in Uruguay.
  Revolutionary Workers' Party (Devrimci İşçi Partisi, DİP) in Turkey.
  Marxist Workers' League (Marxilainen Työväenliitto, MTL) in Finland.
  Workers' Option (Opción Obrera, OO) in Venezuela.
  Revolutionary Worker Renaissance (Renaissance Ouvrière Révolutionnaire, ROR) in France

The Proletarian Society of China periodical The Trotskyist, China/Hong Kong, was close to the CRFI.

See also
List of Trotskyist internationals

References

External links
CRFI statement on Syria
resolution of December 2012 International Secretariat meeting